Eruv ( "mixture"), in Judaism, may refer to:
 Eruvin (Talmud), a tractate in Moed
 Eruv tavshilin, ("mixing of cooked dishes"), which permits cooking on a Friday Holiday to prepare for Shabbat.
 Eruv techumin, ("mixing of borders"), which permits travel beyond the city boundary ("techum") on Shabbat.